General elections were held in Southern Rhodesia on 7 November 1934, fourth elections since the colony of Southern Rhodesia was granted self-government. The elections were called only a year after the previous elections when the Prime Minister, Godfrey Huggins, formed the United Party as a merger of the conservative section of his Reform Party and the former governing Rhodesia Party. Huggins succeeded in winning a landslide, defeating all but one of his Reform Party opponents.

Electoral system
No changes were made to the franchise, the procedure of elections, or electoral boundaries since the previous election.

Political parties
The Reform Party was believed by many in Rhodesia to be a left-wing party but Huggins had presented a cautiously conservative Cabinet after winning power in 1933. In particular, Finance Minister Jacob Smit was a strong believer in conventional economics and opponent of Keynesianism. The course of government led eventually to a confrontration in August 1934 with the left-wing of the party over reform to the Rhodesian railways. Huggins decided to approach Sir Percy Fynn, leader of the Rhodesian Party, who pledged support for a National Government under Huggins.

However, the Acting Governor refused a dissolution on the grounds that the Assembly had many years left, and the government had not been defeated. Huggins persuaded the majority of the Executive of the Reform Party to suspend the party's constitution to allow a National Government on 17 September, and then formed the United Party with Fynn, asking a second time for a dissolution on the basis of a changed party alignment. This time the Acting Governor acceded.

Results

By constituency
 Lab – Rhodesia Labour Party
 Ref – Reform Party
 UP – United Party

Byelections

Hartley
James Joseph Conway died on 10 May 1935, leading to a byelection on 4 July 1935.

Selukwe
Robert Dunipace Gilchrist resigned on 30 June 1935, leading to a byelection on 28 August 1935.

Umtali South
Following his death, there was a byelection to replace Jonathan Hunter Malcolm on 15 September 1936.

Salisbury North
Following his resignation on 31 July 1936, there was a byelection to replace Vernon Arthur Lewis on 21 September 1936.

Eastern
John Louis Martin died on 28 May 1938 and a byelection to replace him was held on 15 August 1938.

Hartley
Following his death, there was a byelection to replace Roger Edward Downes on 30 August 1938.

References
 Source Book of Parliamentary Elections and Referenda in Southern Rhodesia 1898–1962 ed. by F.M.G. Willson (Department of Government, University College of Rhodesia and Nyasaland, Salisbury 1963)
 Holders of Administrative and Ministerial Office 1894–1964 by F.M.G. Willson and G.C. Passmore, assisted by Margaret T. Mitchell (Source Book No. 3, Department of Government, University College of Rhodesia and Nyasaland, Salisbury 1966)

Elections in Southern Rhodesia
Southern Rhodesia
1934 in Southern Rhodesia
Southern Rhodesia
Election and referendum articles with incomplete results